John Doe law may refer to the following:

 Fictitious defendants
 John Doe law (Wisconsin), a prosecution tool used in Wisconsin